Blood on the Fields may refer to:

Music:
Blood on the Fields a jazz oratorio by Wynton Marsalis

Theatre:
Harvest (1934 play) a play by Langston Hughes, Ella Winter, and Ann Hawkins, also known as Blood on the Fields